This is a list of films which placed number-one at the South Korean box office during 2012.

Highest-grossing films

See also
 List of South Korean films of 2012

References

 

South Korea
2012
Box